Monde Zondeki (born 25 July 1982) is a South African international cricketer who played in five Test matches and ten One Day Internationals. He plays first-class cricket for the Cape Cobras and Western Province.

In his first Test, against England in 2003, injury restricted his bowling to just a few overs, but he hit 59 in the first innings and put on 150 for the eighth wicket with Gary Kirsten after South Africa had been 142 for 7. In his second Test, against Zimbabwe in 2004–05, he took 3 for 66 and 6 for 39, giving South Africa an innings victory and winning the award for player of the match.

He was the leading wicket-taker in the 2007–08 South African season, with 62 wickets at 19.17. He represented Warwickshire during the early weeks of the 2008 season, where he was coached by former South African fast bowler Allan Donald. Although he took 4 for 95 in a County Championship match, his spell at Edgbaston was not successful, with 9 wickets at 42.33 in four Championship matches and 1 for 158 in four List A matches.

References

External links
 

1982 births
Living people
ACA African XI One Day International cricketers
Border cricketers
Cape Cobras cricketers
South Africa Twenty20 International cricketers
South Africa One Day International cricketers
South Africa Test cricketers
South African cricketers
Warriors cricketers
Western Province cricketers
Warwickshire cricketers
Sportspeople from Qonce